Physiotherapy is a quarterly peer-reviewed medical journal. It was established in 1915 and is published by Elsevier on behalf of the Chartered Society of Physiotherapy.

References

External links

Physical therapy journals